Amsinckia lycopsoides is a species of fiddleneck known by the common name tarweed fiddleneck or bugloss fiddleneck. It is one of the more common species of fiddleneck. It is native to much of western North America from California to British Columbia. It can be found in a wide variety of areas.

Description
Amsinckia lycopsoides is a bristly annual herb similar in appearance to other fiddlenecks. Its coiled inflorescence contains yellow flowers about a centimeter long and nearly the same in width, with a five-lobed corolla closed at the mouth by the bulges in the lobes. Flowers bloom April to July.

Introduced species
It is an introduced species far beyond the Pacific region, to Alaska, Texas, and New England. In Australia, the species has become a widespread weed of pasture lands.

References

External links
Jepson Manual Treatment
USDA Plants Profile
CalPhotos photo gallery

lycopsoides
Flora of British Columbia
Flora of the Northwestern United States
Flora of California
Flora of the Cascade Range
Flora of the Klamath Mountains
Flora of the Sierra Nevada (United States)
Natural history of the California chaparral and woodlands
Natural history of the California Coast Ranges
Natural history of the Peninsular Ranges
Natural history of the San Francisco Bay Area
Natural history of the Transverse Ranges
Plants described in 1831